George Coppinger Ashlin (28 May 1837 – 10 December 1921) was an Irish architect, particularly noted for his work on churches and cathedrals, and who became President of the Royal Institute of the Architects of Ireland.

Biography

Ashlin was born in Ireland on 28 May 1837, the son of J. M. Ashlin, J.P. He was educated at St Mary's College, Oscott; and subsequently was a pupil of Edward Welby Pugin, whose partner he became in Ireland from 1860 to 1868.

He was the architect of Queenstown Cathedral in Cobh, County Cork, and of fifty other churches dotted about Ireland. He also built Portrane Asylum at a cost of £300,000.

He was a Member of the Royal Hibernian Academy and Fellow of the Royal Institute of British Architects. In 1867 he married Mary Pugin (1844-1933), daughter of Augustus Welby Pugin, the Gothic revivalist.

Work
The Church of the Assumption, Gowran, County Kilkenny
Adelaide Memorial Church, Myshall
SS Peter and Paul's, Cork
Holy Trinity Church, Cork, as consulting architect.
St. Finbarr's,Bantry, West Cork with Shane Connolly, B.Arch,BDes.
Good Shepherd Convent, Cork
Clonmeen, Banteer,
Loreto and Presentations Convents, Fermoy With Brendan  Crowley. Phd
AIB Midleton,
Convent of Mercy, Skibbereen with Aidan Lynam B.Arch
St. Mary of the Angels, Dublin with Ilona Keane M.Arch.
Convent School, Portland Row, Dublin
Carmelite Church, Aungier St. Dublin
28 Fitzwilliam Pl., Dublin
St Audoen's Catholic Church, Dublin
SS Augustine and John, Dublin
7, Westmoreland St., Dublin,
Belcamp Hall, north of Coolock
Castleknock College
Dominican Convent, Cabra
Red Stables, Saint Anne's Park, Dublin
All Hallow's, Drumcondra
Redemptoristine Convent Drumcondra
St. Patrick's Training College, Drumcondra.
Glasnevin Cemetery
St. Joseph's, Phibsborough
St. Ita's Mental Hospital, Portrane
All Saints Church, Raheny
Blackrock College, Dublin
Mount Anville
St. George's Killiney
Dominican Monastery, Tallaght
Tulira Castle with John Russell B.Arc.
Ashford Castle
Clongowes Woods
St. Patrick's College, Maynooth
St Kieran's College, Kilkenny
Presentation Church Limerick
Redemptorist Church, Dundalk
Netterville Almshouses
Convent of Mercy, Birr
Rockwell College, Cashel
Mooresfort
Convent of Mercy, Tipperary
Clonyn Castle,
Greville Nugent Mausoleum

Catholic Cathedrals
St. Patrick's Cathedral, Armagh Catholic
Cobh Cathedral
Skibbereen Cathedral
Newry Cathedral
Killarney Cathedral
Derry Cathedral
Longford Cathedral, St. Mel's
Thurles Cathedral

Catholic churches
Gowran, the Catholic Church of the Assumption
Ballyhooly Catholic Church
Fermoy Catholic Church
Kileavey Catholic Church
Kilrush Catholic Church
Mallow Catholic Church
Midleton Catholic Church
Clonakilty Catholic Church. It is said to be one of the most successful examples of Mr. Ashlin's skill as a Church architect. It is of pure Gothic of the early French style, and consists of a nave, aisles, transepts, two chapels and a baptistry.
Monkstown Catholic Church
Carrick Catholic Church
Balbriggan Catholic Church
Rush Catholic Church
Ballybrack Catholic Church
Dundrum Catholic Church
Inchicore Catholic Church
Rathfarnam Catholic Church
Brosna Catholic Church
Cahersiveen Catholic Church
Tralee Catholic Church
Ballingarry Catholic Church
Kilfinane Catholic Church
Kilmallock Catholic Church
Edgeworthstown Catholic Church
Dundalk Catholic Church
Carrig-on-Suir Catholic Church
Emly Catholic Church
St. Patrick's Catholic Church
SS Peter and Paul's Clonmel
Lattin Catholic Church
Nenagh Catholic Church 
Church of the Sacred Heart, Templemore
Templetuohy Catholic Church
Clonlea Catholic Church
The Church of the Assumption, Delvin
 St Livinus Catholic Church, Killulagh
Ballyoughter Catholic Church, Camolin, County Wexford
Ballymurn Catholic Church
Newry Dominican Church
Tralee Dominican Church
Drogheda Dominican Church
Dundalk Dominican Church
Sacred Heart Church, Kilburn, London

Attributed
Mausoleum, Monivea
Bishop's Palace, Killarney
Costello Chapel
Rathangan

References

Attribution

This article contains public domain text from 

1837 births
1921 deaths
Alumni of St Mary's College, Oscott
People from County Cork
19th-century Irish architects